Cédric Barbosa (born 6 March 1976) is a French professional football player, who plays for AS Saint-Privat and is also the manager of AS Rousson.

Career 
Barbosa is a midfielder and lists Olympique Alès, Montpellier and Stade Rennais as his former clubs. On 30 July 2009 the Third division club Evian signed him from Metz on a free transfer.

In 2016, aged 40, Barbosa left Evian, but stated that he was still looking to play for at least another year. Barbosa then played two seasons with Annecy FC in the Championnat National 2 and one season with Olympique Alès in the Championnat National 3, before retiring. However, 44-year old Barbosa returned to the pitch in November 2019, signing with amateur club AS Saint-Privat to play together with his son, Antoine (born in 1999).

In February 2020, Barbosa was offered to become the manager of Avenir Sportif Roussonnais, better known as AS Rousson, which he accepted. Barbosa had known the club's sporting director, Mouss Guiza, for a while. He was still registered to play for AS Saint-Privat if the calendar allowed it.

Honours
Montpellier
UEFA Intertoto Cup: 1999

References

External links
 Cédric Barbosa's profile, stats & pics

1976 births
Living people
People from Aubenas
French people of Portuguese descent
French footballers
French football managers
Association football midfielders
Ligue 1 players
Ligue 2 players
Championnat National players
Championnat National 2 players
Championnat National 3 players
Olympique Alès players
Montpellier HSC players
Stade Rennais F.C. players
ES Troyes AC players
FC Metz players
Thonon Evian Grand Genève F.C. players
FC Annecy players
Sportspeople from Ardèche
Footballers from Auvergne-Rhône-Alpes